Pak Sha O is an area and a village of Sai Kung North, in Tai Po District, Hong Kong.

Administration
Pak Sha O and Pak Sha O Ha Yeung are recognized villages under the New Territories Small House Policy.

History
It has been reported that the villages of Sham Chung, Lai Chi Chong and Pak Sha O had historically close social ties.

At the time of the 1911 census, the population of Pak Sha O was 117. The number of males was 52.

Chapel
Pak Sha O is the site of the Immaculate Heart of Mary Chapel. A first chapel was built in Pak Sha O in 1880 on another site. The conversion of Pak Sha O into a Catholic village partly resulted from the desire of the villagers to combat the harassment of the tax-lords of Sheung Shui. The current chapel was built between 1915 and 1923. The site is now used as a training campsite by the Catholic Scout Guild.

Other features
 Several buildings of the former Ho Residence and the Ho Ancestral Hall, as well as the King Siu Sai Kui and Hau Fuk Mun in Pak Sha O are Grade I historic buildings.
 Pak Sha O Youth Hostel
 King Siu Sai Kui and Hau Fuk Mun in nearby Pak Sha O Ha Yeung are Grade I historic buildings.

References

External links

 Delineation of area of existing village Pak Sha O (Sai Kung North) for election of resident representative (2019 to 2022)

 Antiquities Advisory Board. Historic Building Appraisal. King Siu Sai Kui and Hau Fuk Mun, Pak Sha O Ha Yeung Pictures

Villages in Tai Po District, Hong Kong
Sai Kung North